Diamond Village may refer to:
 Diamond Village, Saint Vincent and the Grenadines
 Diamond Village, Trinidad and Tobago